The Post Track is an ancient causeway in the valley of the River Brue on the Somerset Levels, England. It dates from around 3838 BCE, making it some 30 years older than the Sweet Track in the same area. Various sections have been scheduled as ancient monuments.

The timber trackway was constructed of long ash planks, with lime and hazel posts spaced along three-metre intervals. According to Coles, the heavy planks of the Post Track were seldom pegged.  The track follows closely in line with the Sweet Track and, before the planks were dated, it was posited that it served as a construction platform for the Sweet Track. It is speculated that it led to places of spiritual significance. It is likely that the route was intended to be a permanent fixture, with the track being updated, maintained, and eventually replaced as it succumbed to the elements. Some of the wood planks also were reused in the Sweet Track when it was built making the specific dating more complex.

References

See also 
 Ancient trackway
 Sweet track
 Historic roads and trails

4th-millennium BC architecture
Ancient trackways in England
Archaeological sites in Somerset
Causeways in Europe
Footpaths in Somerset
History of Somerset
Stone Age sites in England
Prehistoric wooden trackways in Europe